Liu Guobo (born 27 November 1999) is a Chinese footballer who last played for Chinese Super League side Beijing Sinobo Guoan as a midfielder or forward.

Club career
A native to Beijing, along with his younger brother Liu Guobao he would leave his hometown to pursue his football development, initially joining Shanghai Lucky Star before settling at the Shanghai SIPG's youth team. At Shanghai he would win the U18 men's football at the 2017 National Games of China by beating Sichuan in the final. On 3 January 2018 he took the chance to transfer to his hometown club Beijing Guoan. On 11 November 2018, Liu made his Chinese Super League debut for Beijing Guoan against Hebei China Fortune, coming on in the 89th minute for Chi Zhongguo. Liu left Guoan at the end of the 2022 Chinese Super League season.

International career
In October 2018, Liu was included in the squad for the 2018 AFC U-19 Championship.

Career statistics
.

References

External links
 

1999 births
Living people
Chinese footballers
Association football midfielders
Sportspeople from Beijing
Beijing Guoan F.C. players
Chinese Super League players
China under-20 international footballers
21st-century Chinese people